Chaetosiphon is a bug genus in the family Aphididae.

Species, mainly C. fragaefolii, C. thomasi and C. thomasi jacobi, are vectors of the strawberry mild yellow-edge virus.

References

References

External links 

 discoverlife.org
 

Sternorrhyncha genera
Macrosiphini